Pichia membranifaciens is a species of yeast.

References

External links 

Saccharomycetes
Fungal strawberry diseases
Fungi described in 1904